Lohora ophthalmica is a butterfly in the family Nymphalidae. It is found in north-eastern Sulawesi (Sulawesi mainland, the islands of Buton and Kabaena).

The larvae feed on Centotheca longilamina.

References

Sources
Samui Butterflies 22 September 2013
Sulawesi Samui Butterflies 22 September 2013
Butterflies of Southeastern Sulawesi 22 September 2013
Variety of Life 23 September 2013

Butterflies described in 1888
Elymniini
Butterflies of Indonesia